Jerome Alfred Mincy Clark (born November 10, 1964) is a Puerto Rican former professional basketball player who was born to Shelly and Willie Mincy at Ramey Air Force Base in Aguadilla, Puerto Rico on November 10, 1964. He played in the NCAA with the UAB Blazers and the Baloncesto Superior Nacional (BSN) with Vaqueros de Bayamón. He was a member of the Puerto Rican national team from 1983 to 2002.

Biography

Jerome joined the BSN's Vaqueros De Bayamón when he turned 18, in 1982, while attending College at UAB.  Following his senior season he failed to make the roster of the NBA's New York Knicks. He was selected in the fifth round of the 1986 NBA Draft by the Knicks, but never made the roster.  He completed a solid career playing abroad in France, Spain and Argentina with the Boca Juniors.  He also played during the summers in Puerto Rico where he took the Vaqueros to three championships ('88, '95 & '96) and many final appearances. In 2012–2013, he was named an assistant coach for the Mets De Guaynabo in the Puerto Rican league.

He also played for Puerto Rico's national basketball team from 1983 to 2002. He retired from the BSN after the 2002 Finals and from the Puerto Rican National team after the 2002 World Championships in Indianapolis. He participated in 3 Olympic Games competitions representing Puerto Rico. He announced he will stay on the national team, but on an executive position as General Manager he is also the current top assistant with the Vaqueros de Bayamon.

The Vaqueros team retired his jersey, number 17, in 2002. However, Mincy was traded to the Leones de Ponce before the season began.

Career stats
Mincy's NCAA stats are 1473 points with a 10.8 PPG, 933 rebounds, .477 field goal percentage, .638 free-throw percentage.

National team career
Jerome Mincy played at 5 FIBA World Cups: (1986, 1990, 1994, 1998, and 2002). He totaled 36 games played and 383 points scored during those competitions.

See also
List of Puerto Ricans

References

1964 births
Living people
Baloncesto Superior Nacional players
Basketball players at the 1987 Pan American Games
Basketball players at the 1988 Summer Olympics
Basketball players at the 1991 Pan American Games
Basketball players at the 1992 Summer Olympics
Basketball players at the 1995 Pan American Games
Basketball players at the 1996 Summer Olympics
Forwards (basketball)
Goodwill Games medalists in basketball
New York Knicks draft picks
Olympic basketball players of Puerto Rico
Pan American Games bronze medalists for Puerto Rico
Pan American Games gold medalists for Puerto Rico
Pan American Games medalists in basketball
People from Aguadilla, Puerto Rico
Puerto Rican men's basketball players
1990 FIBA World Championship players
Puerto Rico men's national basketball team players
UAB Blazers men's basketball players
1986 FIBA World Championship players
1998 FIBA World Championship players
2002 FIBA World Championship players
Competitors at the 1994 Goodwill Games
Medalists at the 1987 Pan American Games
Medalists at the 1991 Pan American Games
1994 FIBA World Championship players